Bergshamra is a suburb within the Stockholm urban area in Sweden. Administratively it is in Solna Municipality of Stockholm County. The suburb is surrounded on three sides by water, with the Stocksundet sea strait to the north-east, the Ålkistan channel to the south-east, and the Brunnsviken to the south-west. 

Bergshamra station is one of the 100 stations of the Stockholm metro system.

Stockholm urban area
Metropolitan Stockholm
Suburbs in Europe
Solna Municipality